This page provides the summary of Red Bull BC One World Finals Paris 2014.

On November 29, 2014, the world’s 16 best B-Boys went head to head in Pairs’s La Grande Halle de la Vilette to compete for the opportunity to be crowned the Red Bull BC One World Champion. After months of intense one-on-one battles across six continents, more than 2,000 B-Boys competed to secure a place in the World Finals.

Like in 2013, Red Bull BC One held Cyphers, Regional Finals as well as the World Final. Winners of country Cyphers got the chance to compete in one of six global qualifiers in an attempt to reach the World Final. Following the global Cyphers, the Regional Final season ran from mid-July to mid-September. Regional Finals were held for the Americas in USA; Eastern Europe in Croatia; Western Europe in Finland; Latin America in Brazil; Asia Pacific in Taiwan; and Middle East & Africa in Algeria.

Regional Finals

RBBC1 Latin American 2014 results 
Location: Belem, Brazil

RBBC1 North American 2014 results 
Location: Las Vegas, United States

RBBC1 Middle East Africa 2014 results
Location: Algiers, Algeria

RBBC1 Western European 2014 results
Location: Helsinki, Finland

RBBC1 Eastern European 2014 results
Location: Zagreb, Croatia

Judges:

 Hong 10 (Drifterz/7 Commandoz, South Korea)
 Yan the Shrimp (Allthemost, Russia)
 Lamine (France)

Individuals in bold won their respective battles.

RBBC1 Asia Pacific 2014 results 
Location: Taipei, Taiwan

World Finals
Red Bull BC One took place in Paris, France. For the 2014 World Finals, Red Bull BC One utilized a round-by-round judging system used by Undisputed. The round-by-round judging format allows boys to see the judges decision after every round. The battle is set for 3 rounds (Finals is 5) but can end if a bboy beats his opponent in 2. The format should make boys give 100% each and every round because the more unanimous rounds they win, the more rounds they will have heading into the semi-finals and final battle. However, this judging system received a lot of criticism from Red Bull BC One fans throughout social media following the event. Bboys and fans alike, both disagreed heavily with the judges' decisions after many individual battles. Many argued that it was the worst Red Bull BC one competition since its initiation.

Judges 
 The End (South Korea / Gamblerz, Kai Crew)
 Yan the Shrimp (Russia / Allthemost Crew)
 Ken Swift (USA / Rock Steady Crew)
 Yaman (France / Wanted Posse)
 Luigi (USA / Squadron, Skill Methodz)

DJ
 DJ Lean Rock (USA)

2014 Main Event Competitor List

Red Bull BC One 2014 results 
Location: Paris, France

References

External links
 Red Bull BC One World Finals 2014

Red Bull BC One